Rehal (Punjabi: ਰੈਹਿਲ) is a clan found among the Punjabi Jat. The progenitor of the Rehal families is believed to have been born in (Reh). This clan believes in Sikhism. The main villages are Mangewal (ਮਾਗੇਵਾਲ), Halotali, Malewal, Bhadalthuha, Raisal, Sudhewal, Ghundar, Dargapur, Ghullumajra and Haibatpur which all are in the district Patiala villages surrounding Nabha in the Punjab.

References

Surnames
Jat clans